Bernd Windhausen (22 September 1941 – 4 November 2014) was a German professional footballer who played as a forward.

References

External links
 

1941 births
2014 deaths
German footballers
Association football forwards
Bundesliga players
Borussia Fulda players
SpVgg Greuther Fürth players
1. FC Kaiserslautern players
SV Werder Bremen players
West German footballers
People from Duderstadt
Footballers from Lower Saxony